A vulnerable adult is defined as an individual age 18 or older who has the functional, mental, or physical inability to care for themselves. It can also refer to one who is unable to protect themselves against significant harm or exploitation. A vulnerable adult is one that has a substantial mental or functional impairment. A vulnerable adult, due to the reasons listed previously, may also require specific care from community resources. Substantial functional impairment is an inability referring to physical limitations. Substantial mental impairment is a disorder of mood, thought, perception, memory, or orientation. This grossly impairs the person's judgement, behavior, or ability to be independent. The life experiences of these individuals, as a result, can vary significantly from someone that has not been diagnosed as a Vulnerable Adult. 

This does not necessarily mean that the adult lacks competency. The adult's circumstances must be unable to be altered or improved without direct assistance to be classed as vulnerable.

Diagnosis and treatment

If seen by a doctor for a long enough period of time, a vulnerable adult is usually given an official clinical diagnosis of being a vulnerable adult. The purpose of such a diagnosis is to ensure that a relevant social work department, housing authority, etc. (if these exist in the relevant country) is/are able to enter the life of the vulnerable adult for assistive purposes.

If the vulnerable adult has been abused, which is typically the case for long-term vulnerability, trauma counselling and/or an assisted living facility may also be offered to the vulnerable adult by the relevant authority or authorities. Despite the aforementioned services available to vulnerable adults, some remain long-term homeless.

Causes
The main cause of being a vulnerable adult is usually a clinical-level cognitive impairment such as Down syndrome, but it can also be caused and/or exacerbated by other cognition issues and/or the long-term effects of abuse and severe neglect from an early age within a family structure. Some combination of abuse, severe neglect, and cognitive impairments, rather than any one of these things alone, is usually required for an adult to become sufficiently vulnerable to be classed as a vulnerable adult.

Additional causes that could aggravate vulnerability include not having access to basic human needs, such as food, water, shelter, healthcare, and freedom of expression. These circumstances are often unable to be improved unless direct assistance is acquired (examples include food stamps, supplemental income, housing assistance, etc.). Elderly adults are also at increased risk for vulnerability, or needing assistance to change their current situation. These are found by identifying high-risk groups, which typically include frail, poor, childless, or isolated elderly adults. Older adults who retire are at an increased risk for reduced income, which can lead to poverty; these adults usually experienced part-time, insufficiently paid, or insecure employment throughout their working years. These adults could face further vulnerability and risk if they develop an illness that quickly depletes their financial resources.

Effects
A vulnerable adult's activities of daily living are usually impaired. The severity of cognitive impairment in vulnerable adults can range from mild cognitive impairment to severe cognitive impairment. Mild forms of such impairment include not knowing or being able to learn the skills necessary to communicate with a local government authority when help is needed (requiring an appropriate adult to step in to advocate on the vulnerable adult's behalf); not knowing how and not being able to learn to read or write complex documents when required such as letters from a court or a debt collector and thus, avoiding them rather than seeking help to resolve them; not knowing or being able to learn how to navigate basic money management or personal finance; and so on. Severe forms of such impairment are myriad and are usually too complex to precisely define but can include very severe learning disabilities, together with cognitive impairments. These factors limit the ability of the vulnerable adult to either give or receive human communication with another adult who does not have such impairments. Global efforts, such as the United Nations Sustainable Development Goal 4, aim to address these problems by providing lifelong learning opportunities to vulnerable people and ensure equitable education.

A possible result of a vulnerable adult's cognitive impairment is an increased risk of abuse and exploitation. Common acts of abuse are domestic abuse, institutional abuse, and self-neglect. Domestic abuse takes place in a person's home and is typically perpetrated by a caregiver, friend, or a family member, of the victim. Domestic abuse can be physical abuse, sexual abuse, or emotional abuse. Institutional abuse, commonly referred to as organizational abuse, is neglect in an institutional setting, such as a care home, nursing home, or a hospital. Examples of institutional abuse include inappropriate use of power, lack of choice, lack of personal possessions, a non flexible schedule, financial abuse, and/or physical or verbal abuse. In vulnerable adults, the signs of self-neglect include, but are not limited to: poor hygiene, poor health, poor living conditions, malnourishment, dementia, hallucinations, delusions,  isolation, apathy, self-destructive behaviors, and misuse of drugs or alcohol. Vulnerable adults who engage in self-neglecting behaviors engage in them in varying degrees; furthermore it is important to note that not all vulnerable adults engage in self-neglecting behaviors.

Vulnerable adults often are assigned to independent or semi-independent living situations inside assisted living facilities or even "community-supported living" council estates. There are many factors that can determine whether a vulnerable adult is assigned to a specific type of living situation. Some important factors are the resources of the country in question, and also the interpretation by a government authority of the precise degrees of vulnerability, the vulnerable adult is sometimes restricted to a 'residential home' (a quasi-hospital living environment) or is assigned long-term hospitalization.

Legal protection
Problems sometimes arise as to the exact legal status of a vulnerable adult when there is a clear case of the vulnerable adult existing in a "grey area" between mild and severe overall impairment. Sometimes, even when in some ways severely impaired, a vulnerable adult may still be competent enough to not be regarded by the relevant authorities as sufficiently childlike for long-term care.

Vulnerable adults will sometimes have guardians, individuals who have been given rights in a court of law over the vulnerable adult to make decisions that are in the disabled individual's best interest. These decisions may involve medical care and housing. The appointed guardian may be an institution such as a care facility or an individual. Family or friends are sometimes guardians for loved ones who, due to their disability, cannot have guardianship over themselves. Sometimes a professional guardian will be appointed, who is paid from their charge's assets, and is a guardian for a living. A professional guardian such as this may work for and/or with several vulnerable adults.

Guardianship can be a problem when the vulnerable adult does not have friends, family or acquaintances and legally-important matters (such as paperwork) must be properly filled out, but the vulnerable adult is unable to understand what the paperwork contains or why it is important.

In the United Kingdom situations regarding the release of legally important information pertaining to vulnerable adults can be worsened by the Data Protection Act, which prevents even some officials and/or appropriate adults from accessing the vulnerable adult's complete personal information for assistive purposes. Some countries solve these issues by getting the vulnerable adult to sign power of attorney over to a relevant authority's representative, a solicitor providing the vulnerable adult free legal help, or a similar figure.

By country

England and Wales 
NB: the definition of a vulnerable adult in Section 59 of the 2006 act is modified by the Safeguarding Vulnerable Groups Act 2006 (Miscellaneous Provisions) Order 2009, which excludes certain disabilities which do not make an adult vulnerable.

In the law of England and Wales, a wide definition is applied to meet the standard of vulnerable adult. Section 59 of the Safeguarding Vulnerable Groups Act 2006 states that:

A person is a vulnerable adult if, having attained the age of 18, he or she —

 is in residential accommodation,
 is in sheltered housing,
 receives domiciliary care,
 receives any form of health care,
 is detained in lawful custody,
 by virtue of an order of a court, is under supervision per Criminal Justice Act 2003 sections regarding community sentences;
 receives a welfare service of a prescribed description,
 receives any service or participates in any activity provided specifically for persons who has particular needs because of his age, has any form of disability or has a prescribed physical or mental problem. (Dyslexia, dyscalculia and dyspraxia are excluded disabilities),
 has payments made to him/her or to an accepted representative in pursuance of arrangements under Health and Social Care Act 2012, and/or
 requires assistance in the conduct of own affairs.

In most parts of the world, the last section is the usual headlining definition for a vulnerable adult, i.e. the adult is unable to function cognitively or to adequately undertake basic day-to-day functions without the help or oversight of someone not impaired in these ways.

Increasingly, the terms adult at risk, or adult at risk of harm, are preferred to the term vulnerable adult.

Singapore 
In Singapore, the Vulnerable Adults Act ("the Act") was signed on 19 December 2018. The Act defines that a vulnerable adult includes any individual aged 18 years and above (including the elderly) with mental or physical disabilities who is unable to protect himself/herself from abuse, neglect, or self-neglect as a result of these disabilities. In the section 2, the Act explains the meaning of these 3 key terms so the public can understand the types of abuses or neglects and also the State can then intervene as a last resort to protect the vulnerable.

United States 
The United States uses the term "incapacitated adult" interchangeably with the term "vulnerable adult". The Department of Justice defines this as "an adult who is unable to receive and evaluate information or make or communicate informed decisions to such an extent that the adult lacks the ability to meet essential requirements for physical health, safety or self-care, even with reasonably available appropriate technological assistance" (Civil Financial Exploitation 22 M.R.S. § 3472 (2020)).

In 2012, Governor Mark Dayton of Minnesota signed a bipartisan bill for vulnerable adults which made intentional abuse or neglect able to be charged as a felony. The bill also included an increased the penalties for those who use restraints to harm children.
Lawmakers worked with health care workers and the nurses union to craft the law. A blog from the Minnesota Nurses Association said: Before this law, the most severe charges were gross misdemeanors with no prison time. However, now serious bodily injury could carry up to 10 years in prison or up to $10,000 fine or both. On the other hand, partial or considerable bodily harm could bring up to five years in prison or up to $5,000 in fines, or both. 
Minnesota was also the first state  to make it a crime at the same time  protect the rights its the workers in the United States.

Latin America and the Caribbean 
It is estimated that a total of 12% of Latin America and the Caribbeans has a disability of some sort. This comes to a total of 66 million people. There has been an increase of disabled people especially in impoverished communities all over South America and the Caribbean. The ECLAC has allocated resources to examine what can be done for housing for disabled people as well programs for education and employment.

See also
 Institutional abuse
 Hague Protection of Adults Convention

References 

 

 
Sociological terminology